Cynic Guru is a progressive rock band fronted by classically trained violinist Roland Hartwell.

Band history

Early Years: 1991-1996

Cynic Guru started in Los Angeles as 3-piece known as "Where Is My Hair". This featured Roland Hartwell (guitar, vocals), Stefan Örn (bass), and Steef Van Oosterhout (drums).

In 1993, another phase of the band, SkotLaPop, was born.  This incarnation of the band had Roland Hartwell (guitar, vocals, violin) and new members Marc Thomas (lead guitar), Chris Sampson (vocals, guitars), and Matt Matson (drums).

In 1996, the SkotLaPop became "Cynic Guru". Chris Sampson left the band and was replaced by Mike Constantini (guitars, vocals) and Vince Varquez (bass).

Mid-life: 1996-2000

Hartwell, a classically trained violin player, got offered a job touring with the Iceland Symphony Orchestra on the East Coast of the US sometime in the late 1990s. They liked him so much, that they eventually offered him a full-time position within the group. After enough commuting back and forth from Iceland, Hartwell decided to accept the offer, leaving Cynic Guru with him.

Iceland: 2001–present

It wasn't until long that Roland Hartwell decided re-form Cynic Guru in Reykjavik, Iceland. He did this adding members Ricky Korn (bass), Einar Jóhannsson (lead guitar and backing vocs), Óli Hólm (drums), and John Mono (backing vocals and keyboards).

About 3–4 years later, Cynic Guru was signed to SENA, the largest record label/entertainment group in Iceland. This paved the way for "Iceland"- Cynic Guru's debut album. Although many of the songs on Iceland had already been included in past EPs, most were either re-arranged or simply re-recorded. After nearly a year in production, "Iceland", was released on September 26, 2005.  The first single from "Iceland", "Drugs", made it to the number one spot on X-FM 97.7 in Reykjavík, beating out Queens of the Stone Age, Papa Roach, Green Day, Audioslave, The Transplants, Used/My Chemical Romance, and Nine Inch Nails.

"Iceland" also has had two other singles that hit radio; "Catastrophe", written about 9/11, and "Digging The Holes." Videos were made for "Drugs" and "Catastrophe", which were directed by Icelandic artist Bardi Johannsson, of Bang Gang.

2005 started off with a bit of a jolt. Cynic Guru was picked up by a British label, Fat Northerner Records, and a Japanese label, Westwood Records, for distribution. Sadly, however, John Mono decided to part ways with the band.

Cynic Guru had their first UK tour in June 2006. "Drugs" was re-released as a single on iTunes and on 7" vinyl in the UK, with the b-side "Dick". A re-release of "Iceland" is expected by September/October 2008.

Cynic Guru is currently in the studio recording their second album, (tentatively self-titled) which should be completed by early 2008. Tracks expected to be on it include "The Birthday Song", "Over", "Pretty Religion", "Remedy", and "Serpentine".

Major Releases

Iceland

Released September 26, 2005

1.  DYFWIWTYWLF (Did You Find What It Was That You Were Looking For)
2.  Catastrophe
3.  Drugs
4.  Death of a Guitarist
5.  Digging the Holes
6.  Ballistic
7.  Ice Cream
8.  Scab
9.  Belly
10.  Texas
11.  Yellow Bag
12.  V.P.
13.  Dick

Drugs (single)

Released June 2006

1.  Drugs
2.  Dick

Cynic Guru (self-titled)[rumoured title]

Slated for release in 2008, Roland has said that likely tracks will include remakes of the eponymous song Cynic Guru, 3 Martinis, Psycho, Better, Serpentine, Radiation, and a new track called The Downfall of the Enemy.

External links
Cynic Guru's website.

American progressive rock groups